Çuxuryurd (also, Chukhur”yurt and Chukhuryurd) is a village and municipality in the Shamakhi Rayon of Azerbaijan.  It has a population of 826. 

Near the village there is a lake surrounded by hills. In the village you can find three little shops and one "Apteka" (pharmacy).

References 

Populated places in Shamakhi District